Graham Cecil Scott  (born 1942) is a former official of the New Zealand government and a political candidate. 

After a 1972 PhD from Duke University titled  'Industrial production and investment in a dynamic, multiregional, interindustry model of the United States,'  he became Secretary of the New Zealand Treasury in 1986, and held that post until 1993. He later headed the Health Funding Authority and the Central Regional Health Authority. He was the executive chairman of Southern Cross Advisors Ltd.

In the 1995 Queen's Birthday Honours, Scott was appointed a Companion of the Order of the Bath, for public services.

In the 2005 elections, he was ranked fifth place on ACT New Zealand's party list, but the party did not gain enough votes for him to enter Parliament.

References

External links
  Downloadable publications and speeches
 Profile with downloadable CV

1942 births
Living people
ACT New Zealand politicians
New Zealand public servants
New Zealand economists
New Zealand Companions of the Order of the Bath
Unsuccessful candidates in the 2005 New Zealand general election
University of Canterbury alumni
Duke University alumni